Marcy Township is one of seventeen townships in Boone County, Iowa, USA.  As of the 2000 census, its population was 1,137.

History
Marcy Township was organized in 1858. It is named for William L. Marcy.

Geography
According to the USGS, it contains seven cemeteries: Glenwood, Holloway, Oakwood, Pleasant Hill, Quincy, Sparks and Swede Valley Lutheran.

References

External links
 US-Counties.com
 City-Data.com

Townships in Boone County, Iowa
Townships in Iowa
1858 establishments in Iowa